Mischa Dohler is a Fellow of the Royal Academy of Engineering, Fellow of the Institute of Electrical and Electronics Engineers (IEEE)  and Fellow of the Royal Society of Arts (RSA).

He was a Chair Professor of Wireless Communications at King's College London, where he worked on 6G  and the Internet of Skills. He has been appointed to the Spectrum Advisory Board of Ofcom.

Career
He was a CTO at  Worldsensing. He was a CTO at Sirius Insight.

References

External links
Faculty profile
Personal website

1975 births
Living people
Alumni of King's College London
Academics of King's College London
Electronics engineers